Dead Horses is the sixth full-length album by the band Evergreen Terrace. It was released through Rise Records on December 10, 2013, the band's first release through the label.

It is the first album not featuring guitarist Josh James, who was replaced by Alex Varian. It is also the band's first album with bassist Jason Southwell since 2007's Wolfbiker.

Background and release
The album was recorded in the summer of 2013.

The first song released from the album was the title track on October 22. The song "When You're Born in the Gutter, You End Up in the Port" was released on November 19. The entire album was available for streaming on Rise's official YouTube channel on December 7.

Track listing

Credits

Evergreen Terrace
 Andrew Carey - vocals
 Craig Chaney - guitar, vocals
 Jason Southwell - bass
 Brad Moxey - drums
 Alex Varian - guitar

Production
 Produced by Craig Chaney & Stan Martell
 Recorded, Mixed, Mastered & additional instrumentation by Stan Martell

References

2013 albums
Evergreen Terrace albums
Rise Records albums